Shelter from the Ash is the tenth album by experimental indie rock band, Six Organs of Admittance, released on November 20, 2007. It continues the progression begun on School of the Flower, from experimental acoustic pieces, toward more standard rock song structures.

Track listing
 "Alone with the Alone" – 4:15
 "Strangled Road" – 5:34
 "Jade Like Wine" – 4:11
 "Coming to Get You" – 7:28
 "Goddess Atonement" – 6:01
 "Final Wing" – 8:35
 "Shelter from the Ash" – 3:24
 "Goodnight" – 3:36

References

2007 albums
Six Organs of Admittance albums
Drag City (record label) albums